Alberto Suárez Santos (born 20 October 1981) is a Spanish retired footballer who played as a forward.

Club career
Born in Gijón, Asturias, Suárez spent the vast majority of his career in the third division or lower. Over a nine-year senior spell he represented Astur CF, Real Oviedo B, Deportivo Alavés B, SD Eibar – his only second level experience, in the 2004–05 season– Marino de Luanco, Real Jaén and Cultural y Deportiva Leonesa.

Personal life
Suárez's older brother, Eugenio, was also a professional footballer. More successful, he played in more than 100 official games with Oviedo.

References

External links

1981 births
Living people
Footballers from Gijón
Spanish footballers
Association football forwards
Segunda División players
Segunda División B players
Tercera División players
Real Oviedo Vetusta players
Deportivo Alavés B players
SD Eibar footballers
Marino de Luanco footballers
Real Jaén footballers
Cultural Leonesa footballers